Banjariya may refer to:

Banjariya, Lumbini, Nepal
Banjariya, Narayani, Nepal